Chase Middleton (born March 27, 1997) is an American football linebacker who is currently a free agent. He was most recently a member of the Calgary Stampeders of the Canadian Football League (CFL). Middleton played college football at Georgia State.

College career
Middleton was a two year starter and four year letter-winner for the Panthers as a linebacker. He ended his collegiate career ranked sixth in program history with 191 career tackles. He was a part of the Georgia State program's first-ever bowl game win in the 2017 Cure Bowl.

Professional career

Houston Texans
Middleton was signed by the Houston Texans as an undrafted free agent after the 2019 NFL Draft. He was waived prior to Preseason.

Atlanta Falcons
On August 9, 2019, Middleton signed with the Atlanta Falcons and appeared in the final two preseason games. He was released on August 31, 2019.

Calgary Stampeders
On September 30, 2019, Middleton signed with the practice squad of the Calgary Stampeders. He appeared in two games before being released at the end of the practice squad expansion period.

References

External links
Calgary Stampeders bio
Georgia State Panthers bio

1997 births
Living people
Players of American football from Georgia (U.S. state)
Georgia State Panthers football players
Houston Texans players
Atlanta Falcons players
Calgary Stampeders players
People from Lilburn, Georgia